Rendadi is a village in Vellore district in the Indian state of Tamil Nadu.

References

External links
List of Village Panchayats in Tamilnadu
Village Panchayat Names of SHOLINGHUR,VELLORE,TAMIL NADU

Villages in Vellore district